The Gabilan Range or Gabilán Range (Spanish for "sparrow hawk") are a mountain range in the inner California Coast Ranges System, located in Monterey County and San Benito County of central California.  Pinnacles National Park is located in the southern section of the range.

Geography

The Gabilan Range trends in a northwest–southeast direction along the Monterey County and San Benito County line. It is bordered on the east by the Diablo Range, the San Andreas Fault, and State Route 25; and on the west by the Salinas Valley, Santa Lucia Range, and U.S. Route 101. The northern limit of the Gabilan Range lies just south of Pinecate Peak and San Juan Bautista, California.

History
In Spanish, gavilán (gabilan is an older alternate rendering) means "sparrow hawk".  Hawks, especially the red-tailed hawk, are common in the range.

The Gabilan Mountains and other nearby places are mentioned in several novels by John Steinbeck, such as Of Mice and Men and East of Eden. In The Red Pony notably, the main character (Jody Tiflin) names his pony "Gabilan" after the mountain range.

Fremont Peak was named for John C. Frémont, an American explorer and a Captain in the U.S. Army Corps of Topographical Engineers who assessed the military value of the peak in 1846, posing a threat to the Mexican authorities. It is now a California State Park.

Ecology
One of the last relatively undeveloped corridors for wildlife passage between the southern Santa Cruz Mountains and the northern Gabilan Range runs from lands between Mount Pajaro and Rancho Juristac, in southern Santa Cruz and Santa Clara counties respectively, south across California State Route 129 and U.S. Highway 101 to lands between Pinecate Peak and San Juan Bautista in San Benito County. The Land Trust of Santa Cruz County has protected the first block of land intended to protect the Santa Cruz Mountains-Gabilan Range Wildlife Corridor, the  Rocks Ranch in Aromas at the border of San Benito and Monterey counties.

See also

California interior chaparral and woodlands
Pinnacles National Park

References

External links
 National Park Service: Pinnacles National Park website

 
California Coast Ranges
Mountain ranges of Monterey County, California
Mountain ranges of San Benito County, California
Pinnacles National Park
John Steinbeck
Mountain ranges of Northern California